Rylee Ann Baisden (born April 16, 1994) is an American professional soccer player who plays as a forward for Perth Glory in the A-League Women.

Early life 
Baisden grew up in Orange County, California and went to school in Los Angeles.

Pepperdine University 
Baisden attended college at Pepperdine University.

Club career 
After her college career, Baisden went to play briefly in Sweden and played for a year in France.

Australia 
For the 2018–19 season, Baisden moved to Australia to play for Morton Bay United in the National Premier League where she scored 33 goals in 23 games.

Due to her form Baisden was named in the league's team of the season, was nominated for player of the year and participated in Morton Bay's maiden grand final appearance.

On the back of this form Baisden was drafted by Brisbane Roar ahead of the 2019–20 W-League season. Baisden admitted that she did not expect to be offered the contract.

She debuted in Brisbane's first game of the 2019–20 season against Melbourne Victory, and scored her first goal in the W-league in their next match, a 3–1 loss to Western Sydney Wanderers.

International career 
Baisden represented the United States at the World University Games in Taiwan.

Personal life 
Baisden is passionate about photography, and has started a photography business, where she also works with drones.

References

External links 
 
RyleeBaisden.com - Rylee's official website

1994 births
Living people
Sportspeople from Orange County, California
Soccer players from California
American women's soccer players
Women's association football forwards
Brisbane Roar FC (A-League Women) players
Perth Glory FC (A-League Women) players
A-League Women players
American expatriate women's soccer players
American expatriate sportspeople in Australia
Expatriate soccer players in Australia
Pepperdine Waves women's soccer players
North Carolina Courage players
National Women's Soccer League players
People from Yorba Linda, California